The women's 70 kilograms (middleweight) competition at the 2010 Asian Games in Guangzhou was held on 14 November at the Huagong Gymnasium.

Hwang Ye-sul of South Korea won the gold medal.

Schedule
All times are China Standard Time (UTC+08:00)

Results

Main bracket

Repechage

References

Results

External links
 
 Draw

W70
Judo at the Asian Games Women's Middleweight
Asian W70